Cecilia Hart (February 19, 1948 – October 16, 2016), sometimes credited as Ceci Jones, was an American actress who played Stacey Erickson in the CBS police drama Paris, which originally ran from 1979 until 1980. Hart co-starred with her future husband James Earl Jones in the series.

Biography
A native of Cheyenne, Wyoming, and the daughter of an Army colonel and his wife, Hart moved to New York City to pursue an acting career. She appeared on Broadway in Tom Stoppard's play Dirty Linen and New-Found-Land from January to March 1977, winning the 1977 Theatre World Award. She appeared on Broadway in The Heiress (1976) and Design for Living (1984), and in Othello as a replacement "Desdemona" in March 1982. Hart starred opposite Paxton Whitehead in five plays before appearing together in Bedroom Farce at the Westport Country Playhouse in 2015. The production ran from August 25, 2015, through September 13, 2015.

Personal life
Hart married actor Bruce Weitz in 1971; they divorced in 1980. She married actor James Earl Jones in 1982; it was also his second marriage. They had one child, Flynn Earl Jones (born 1982), and were married until Hart's death.

Death
Hart died on October 16, 2016, aged 68, from ovarian cancer, in Westport, Connecticut.

Filmography

References

External links
 
 

1948 births
2016 deaths
20th-century American actresses
21st-century American actresses
Actresses from Wyoming
American stage actresses
American television actresses
Deaths from cancer in Connecticut
Deaths from ovarian cancer
People from Cheyenne, Wyoming